Smiling Sammy: Fox Trot is a World War I era song released in 1917. The music was written by Arthur M. Kraus. The song was published by Jerome H. Remick & Co. in Detroit, Michigan. On the cover of the sheet music, there is a soldier marching with a gun resting on his shoulder. The cover artist is Tony Sarg. The song was written for piano.

The sheet music can be found at Pritzker Military Museum & Library.

References

Songs about soldiers
Songs about fictional male characters
Foxtrots
1917 songs
Songs of World War I